Freedom is the fifteenth studio album by Santana. By this recording, Santana had nine members, some of whom had returned after being with the band in previous versions. Freedom moved away from the more poppy sound of the previous album, Beyond Appearances and back to the band's original Latin rock. It failed, however, to revive Santana's commercial fortunes, reaching only ninety-five on the album chart.

Track listing

Side one 
 "Veracruz" (Jeffrey Cohen, Buddy Miles, Gregg Rolie, Carlos Santana) – 4:23
 "She Can't Let Go" (Cohen, Tom Coster, Alphonso Johnson, Cory Lerios) – 4:45
 "Once It's Gotcha" (Cohen, Coster, Johnson) – 5:42
 "Love Is You" [Instrumental] (Santana, Chester D. Thompson) – 3:54
 "Songs of Freedom" (Coster, Miles, Santana) – 4:28

Side two 
 "Deeper, Dig Deeper" (Sterling Crew, Miles, Santana, Thompson) – 4:18
 "Praise" (Crew, Miles, Santana, Thompson) – 4:36
 "Mandela" [Instrumental] (Armando Peraza) – 5:31
 "Before We Go" (Jim Capaldi, Santana) – 3:54
 "Victim of Circumstance" (Crew, Miles, Gary Rashid, Santana) – 5:21

Personnel 
Carlos Santana – guitar, vocals
Tom Coster – keyboards
Chester D. Thompson – keyboards
Gregg Rolie – synthesizer, keyboards
 Sterling Crew – keyboards/synths
Alphonso Johnson – bass
Graham Lear – drums
Armando Peraza – percussion, conga
Orestes Vilató – percussion, timbales
 Raul Rekow – percussion, conga, vocals
Buddy Miles – vocals

Charts

References

External links 
 

1987 albums
Santana (band) albums
Columbia Records albums
Albums produced by Carlos Santana